Harry Chozen (September 27, 1915 – September 16, 1994) was a professional baseball player in the 1930s, 1940s, and 1950s. Although Chozen only played in one game in the major leagues (for the Cincinnati Reds, batting 1-for-4) he had a 17-year career in the minor leagues as a catcher. Chozen is best known for setting a Southern Association record when he had a base hit in 49 games in a row in 1945. His brothers, Myer and Robert, also played baseball in the minor leagues. He was Jewish.

References

Further reading

External links

1915 births
1994 deaths
Major League Baseball catchers
Cincinnati Reds players
Minor league baseball managers
Baseball players from Minnesota
People from Winnebago, Minnesota
Jewish American baseball players
Jewish Major League Baseball players
20th-century American Jews
Albany Senators players
El Dorado Lions players
Fort Worth Cats players
Greenville Bucks players
Lake Charles Lakers players
Lake Charles Skippers players
Memphis Chickasaws players
Miami Beach Flamingos players
Mobile Bears players
Newport News Builders players
Pine Bluff Cardinals players
Pine Bluff Judges players
Williamsport Grays players